Pilikuththuwa Raja Maha Vihara (Sinhalaː පිළිකුත්තුව රජ මහා විහාරය ) is an ancient Cave temple situated in Pilikuththuwa, Sri Lanka. The temple has been formally recognised by the Government as an archaeological site in Sri Lanka.

History
From the archaeological evidences, it is believed that this area has been inhabited since pre-historic times. Caves with drip ledges prove that the temple may have been used during the periods of 2-3 century BC by the Sangha as their abodes. According to the legends connected with this temple, king Valagamba (89-77 BC) used to stay in this historical place from time to time during the invasion from South India.

Uruwala, Maligatenna, Warana, Miriswatta and Koskandawala cave temples, situated in the vicinity of the Pilikuththuwa temple are said to have been formed from one major temple complex in the early Anuradhapura period.

The temple

The Pilikuththuwa temple is considered as one of the Buddhist temples in the country with highest number of drip ledged rock caves. It is said that this temple has 99 rock caves with drip ledges, spreading about 200 acres of total area. As at today, 78 of caves have been identified.

Beside the rock caves, inscription with pre-Brahmi characters belonging to the 3rd century CE, drip ledged caves, the pond made with Cairn of stones, ancient mould creeper, wooden bridge belonging to the Kandyan period, the Dagoba with its natural Vatadage, ancient reservoir, roads, water pools, and natural water ponds, increase the historical importance of this site. On 1 November 1996, the archaeological department declared the image house of the temple as an monument under the government Gazette number 948. In 2002, all the caves with drip ledges, the Awasageya (Bhikkhu dwellings), the wooden bridge, the pond, the Dagoba with drip ledged cave and stone inscriptions belong to the temple were declared as protected monuments. The Darmasala building (preaching hall) was included in to the list on 15 April 2016.

References

External links

 
Historic and scenic, The Sunday Times (Sri Lanka)
Exploring the heights of Pilikuththuwa, The Island (Sri Lanka)

Buddhist temples in Gampaha District
Buddhist caves in Sri Lanka
Archaeological protected monuments in Gampaha District